William Henzell (born 1982) is a right-handed Australian Table Tennis player generally regarded to be the greatest player Australia has produced. He was born in Adelaide and moved to Sweden at the age of 14. His highest international ranking was 90 in 2012. He has represented Australia many times, including securing Australia's first Commonwealth Games table tennis singles medal with a silver medal at the 2006 Commonwealth Games. William has represented Australia at 3 Olympic Games (2004, 2008, 2012) with a career best finish of 17th in 2012—Australia's highest singles placing ever. He was inducted into the Australia Table Tennis Hall of Fame at the age of 26, 20 years younger than any other of the inductees.

In 2010, William, in partnership with top Australian player Robert Frank, created the online table tennis coaching website ttedge.com.

Career achievements

International
 Represented Australia
 2004, 2008, 2012 Olympic Games
 2002, 2006, 2010, 2014 Commonwealth Games
 8 world championships

Achievements
 2006 Commonwealth Games Men's Singles Silver Medal
 13 times Australian National Champion - 2001, 02, 05, 06, 07, 08, 09, 10, 11, 12, 13, 14, 15
 5 times Australian Open Champion - 2005, 07, 08, 09, 10
 10 times Oceania Singles Champion - 2004, 2006, 2007, 2009, 2010, 2011, 2012, 2013, 2014, 2015

National
 Australian Champion (13 times) 2001, 2002, 2005, 2006, 2007, 2008, 2009, 2010, 2011, 2012, 2013, 2014, 2015
 Australia - Ranked no 1 (14 times) 2001–02, 04-15
 International - 99 - August 2014

References

1982 births
Living people
Australian male table tennis players
Table tennis players at the 2004 Summer Olympics
Table tennis players at the 2008 Summer Olympics
Table tennis players at the 2012 Summer Olympics
Olympic table tennis players of Australia
Table tennis players at the 2014 Commonwealth Games
Commonwealth Games medallists in table tennis
Commonwealth Games silver medallists for Australia
Medallists at the 2006 Commonwealth Games